Surovsky is a rural locality (a settlement) in Ostrovksoye Rural Settlement, Anninsky District, Voronezh Oblast, Russia. The population was 109 as of 2010.

Geography 
Surovsky is located 48 km east of Anna (the district's administrative centre) by road. Ostrovki is the nearest rural locality.

References 

Rural localities in Anninsky District